James J. "Buster" Brown (born c. 1930) was a Canadian football player who played for the Hamilton Tiger-Cats. He won the Grey Cup with them in 1953. He previously played football at and attended McGill University.

References

1930s births
Possibly living people
Year of birth uncertain
Hamilton Tiger-Cats players
McGill Redbirds football players
McGill University alumni